Land 2 Air Chronicles II: Imitation Is Suicide Chapter 3 is an EP by American singer-songwriter Kenna.  It is the third, and final, EP in the Land 2 Air Chronicles II series, released from September 2013 to December 2013.

Track listing

Production
Co-producer – RJD2

References 

Kenna albums
2013 EPs